Ernest Sterckx (1 December 1922 – 3 February 1975) was a Belgian professional racing cyclist. He won the 1946 Gent-Wevelgem and Omloop Het Nieuwsblad in 1952, 1953 and 1956.

References

External links
 

1922 births
1975 deaths
Belgian male cyclists
People from Westerlo
Cyclists from Antwerp Province
20th-century Belgian people